Dangerous Business is a 1920 American silent comedy film directed by Roy William Neill and starring Constance Talmadge, Kenneth Harlan, and George Fawcett.

Plot
Clarence Brooks is a shy, timid man working for Mr. Flavell. He is love with Flavell's daughter, Nancy.  Nancy is shallow and fickle, always chasing after other, less-upstanding men.  Clarence enlists when World War I erupts.  While Clarence is off defending his country, Nancy's mother arranges for her daughter to marry the wealthy Mr. Braille.  When Braille is drafted, Nancy's mother starts arranging a rush wedding, against Nancy's wishes.  Nancy claims that she and Clarence are already secretly married.  

When the war is over and Clarence returns home, he refuses to be a part of her charade.  When Clarence declines the offer to marry Nancy for real, she must mature to win his affections back.

Cast
 Constance Talmadge as Nancy Flavelle 
 Kenneth Harlan as Clarence Brooks 
 George Fawcett as Mr. Flavell 
 Mathilde Brundage as Mrs. Flavell 
 John Raymond as Mr. Braille 
 Florida Kingsley as Mrs. Brooks 
 Nina Cassavant as Genevieve

Preservation
There are no listings of Dangerous Business in any film archives, making it a lost film.

References

Bibliography
 Goble, Alan. The Complete Index to Literary Sources in Film. Walter de Gruyter, 1999.

External links

1920 films
1920 comedy films
Silent American comedy films
Films directed by Roy William Neill
American silent feature films
1920s English-language films
American black-and-white films
First National Pictures films
Lost American films
1920 lost films
1920s American films